is a Japanese professional footballer who plays as a left back for the J1 League club Nagoya Grampus.

Career
Akinari Kawazura joined J1 League club Omiya Ardija in 2017. On April 12, he debuted in the J.League Cup against Kashiwa Reysol. After five years playing for Omiya Ardija, making over 100 appearances for the club, Kawazura joined the J1 League club Nagoya Grampus in December 2021.

Club statistics

References

External links
Profile at Nagoya Grampus

1994 births
Living people
Meiji University alumni
Association football people from Kyoto Prefecture
Japanese footballers
J1 League players
J2 League players
Omiya Ardija players
Nagoya Grampus players
Association football defenders